Residual-excited linear prediction
 Reliable Event Logging Protocol for data logging in computer networks
 Real Estate Limited Partnership
 Real Estate Lenders Policy
 Regenerating protein-like protein
 Real-e-live-People
 Rassemblement des Étudiants Libanais à Paris
 Relationship Pattern